At the 1998 Winter Olympics, fifteen Nordic skiing events were contested – ten cross-country skiing events, three ski jumping events, and two Nordic combined events.

1998 Winter Olympics events
1998